"You Only Tell Me You Love Me When You're Drunk" is a song by English synth-pop duo Pet Shop Boys, released on 3 January 2000 as the third and final single from their seventh studio album, Nightlife (1999). It reached number eight on the UK Singles Chart, but failed to chart on the US Billboard Hot 100. It also missed the Bubbling Under Hot 100 chart, and the Hot Dance Club Play chart, the first Pet Shop Boys single to miss that chart entirely since "Single-Bilingual" in 1996.

Track listings
 UK CD single 1
 "You Only Tell Me You Love Me When You're Drunk" – 3:16
 "Lies" (performed by Chris Lowe) – 4:42
 "Sail Away" (written by Noël Coward) – 4:37
 "You Only Tell Me You Love Me When You're Drunk" (music video)

 UK CD single 2
 "You Only Tell Me You Love Me When You're Drunk" (The T-Total Mix Edit) – 5:00
 "You Only Tell Me You Love Me When You're Drunk" (Brother Brown's Newt Mix) – 10:00
 "You Only Tell Me You Love Me When You're Drunk" (Attaboy Still Love You When We're Sober Mix) – 4:57

 UK CD single 3
 "You Only Tell Me You Love Me When You're Drunk" (live) – 2:34
 "Always on My Mind" (live) – 4:02
 "Being Boring" (live) – 6:46

 UK 12-inch single
A. "You Only Tell Me You Love Me When You're Drunk" (Brother Brown's Newt Mix) – 10:00
B. "You Only Tell Me You Love Me When You're Drunk" (Attaboy Still Love You When We're Sober Mix) – 8:00
C. "You Only Tell Me You Love Me When You're Drunk" (The T-Total Mix) – 8:14
D. "You Only Tell Me You Love Me When You're Drunk" (Brother Brown's Newt Dub) – 7:41

Charts

References

1999 songs
2000 singles
Parlophone singles
Pet Shop Boys songs
Songs written by Chris Lowe
Songs written by Neil Tennant